Little Nikita is a 1988 American thriller film directed by Richard Benjamin and starring River Phoenix and Sidney Poitier. The film marks the first collaboration between Phoenix and Poitier (the second being Sneakers in 1992).

Plot
Jeffrey Nicolas Grant (River Phoenix), a brash hyperactive high school student, lives in a San Diego suburb with his parents, who own a successful garden center. Keen to fly, he has applied for entry to the Air Force Academy.

During a routine background check on Jeff, FBI agent Roy Parmenter (Poitier) finds evidence they may be sleeper agents for the Soviet Union. Unable to arrest them as they have not done anything illegal, Roy continues his investigation, moves into the house across the street from the Grant family, and worms his way into their confidence.

He eventually confronts Jeff with his suspicions and seeks Jeff's cooperation to learn more about his parents. Initially unbelieving, Jeff is soon forced to accept the facts and discovers that even his name is fictitious and that his real name is Nikita.

Roy confides to Jeff that twenty years earlier, his partner was killed by a Soviet agent, known only as 'Scuba' (Richard Lynch), and that he is still at large. 'Scuba' is now a rogue agent, killing KGB agents one by one, including "sleepers". Meanwhile, a Soviet spy-catcher, Konstantin Karpov (Richard Bradford), has been sent from the Soviet embassy in Mexico City to 'reel in' Scuba.

Jeff is captured and held as a hostage at gunpoint by Karpov, as he and 'Scuba' make their way to the Mexican border on the San Diego Trolley. Roy has also confronted them and is holding Karpov at gunpoint. At the border, the situation resolves itself; Karpov and 'Scuba' cross into Mexico, and the Grant family remain in the United States.

Cast

 Sidney Poitier as Roy Parmenter
 River Phoenix as Jeff Grant / Nikita
 Richard Jenkins as Richard Grant
 Caroline Kava as Elizabeth Grant
 Richard Bradford as Konstantin Karpov
 Loretta Devine as Verna McLaughlin
 Richard Lynch as Scuba
 Lucy Deakins as Barbara Kerry

In addition, the film co-starred Jerry Hardin as Brewer, Albert Fortell as Bunin, Ronald Guttnan as Spassky and Jacob Vargas as Miguel.

Production
A parade scene was filmed in downtown La Mesa and much of the principal photography occurred throughout San Diego.

Reception
The movie received mixed reviews and holds a "Rotten" score of 53% on Rotten Tomatoes from a sample of 15 critics. Walter Goodman said that Benjamin's directing strategy in the film "seems to have been to paper over the holes in the plot with routine moves from spy shows past, in hopes of making the improbable passable." Roger Ebert awarded the film one and a half stars, suspecting that Poitier and the makers of the film had no idea of how to use a computer, and that "it turns all of the characters into chess pieces, whose relationships depend on the plot, not on human chemistry. Since the plot is absurdly illogical, you're not left with much."

Box office
It grossed $866,398 on its opening weekend. It went on to make $1.7 million in North America.

See also

 List of media set in San Diego

References

External links

1988 films
1988 drama films
1980s spy films
1988 thriller films
American spy films
American thriller films
Cold War spy films
Films scored by Marvin Hamlisch
Films directed by Richard Benjamin
Columbia Pictures films
Films with screenplays by Bo Goldman
Films set in San Diego
Films about the Federal Bureau of Investigation
1980s English-language films
1980s American films
Films shot in San Diego